Wakeham is an English surname. Notable people with the surname include:

 Bill Wakeham (born 1944), British chemical engineer
 John Wakeham (born 1932), British businessman and politician
 Tony Wakeham, Canadian politician

English toponymic surnames
Surnames of English origin
English-language surnames